Wilberforce was a cat who lived at 10 Downing Street between 1973 and 18 May 1986 and served under four British Prime Ministers: Edward Heath, Harold Wilson, Jim Callaghan and Margaret Thatcher. His chief function was to catch mice, in which role he was the successor to Peta. In life he had been referred to as "the best mouser in Britain", as befitted his role.

History and career 
Wilberforce was still a kitten when he was adopted from the Hounslow branch of the RSPCA in 1973.  This was while Edward Heath was Prime Minister. He was appointed the Office Manager's cat, with a living allowance for his care. The black-and-white cat turned out to be a very good mouser. The policeman on security duty at the front door of Number 10 had instructions to ring the bell for Wilberforce whenever he wanted to come indoors.

According to Bernard Ingham, the former press secretary to Margaret Thatcher, Wilberforce was a normal cat for whom Thatcher once bought "a tin of sardines in a Moscow supermarket".

On the BBC coverage of the 1983 general election, presenter Esther Rantzen was allowed to hold Wilberforce and introduce him to viewers.

Wilberforce retired in 1986, after 13 years of loyal service. He went to live with a retired caretaker from No. 10 in the country. He died in his sleep on 19 May 1988.

See also
 List of individual cats

References

Further reading 

 In pictures: animals at Downing Street: Wilberforce The Daily Telegraph

1988 animal deaths
Individual cats in England
Individual cats in politics
Working cats
Chief Mousers to the Cabinet Office